Campanula raineri (Rainer's bellflower, Rainer's harebell) is a species of flowering plant in the genus Campanula of the family Campanulaceae, native to the Swiss and Italian Alps. It is suitable for cultivation in the alpinum or rock garden. It spreads by underground runners. Its locus classicus is located in Canzo, Lombardy.

This plant has gained the Royal Horticultural Society's Award of Garden Merit.

References 

raineri